Hanagita Peak is a summit in the Chugach Mountains in the Wrangell-St. Elias National Park and Preserve of Alaska, United States. The prominent is  ranking it 67th on the list of prominent peaks in the United States.

The peak was named in 1911 and is named after Chief Hanagita of Chitina.

See also

List of mountain peaks of Alaska
List of the most prominent summits of Alaska

References

Mountains of Alaska
Wrangell–St. Elias National Park and Preserve